Orange identifies various species of trees, some with edible fruit and some not. Citrus sinensis includes many of the cultivated oranges used for their fruit, the common supermarket orange. Other species called oranges include:

Family Rutaceae
 Aegle marmelos, Japanese bitter orange
Some of the Citrus species, including:
 Citrus × sinensis, sweet oranges, Valencia oranges, Navel oranges, and blood oranges
Citrus ampullacea, flask-shaped orange
 Citrus aurantium, bitter orange, Seville orange, Indian lemon
Citrus bergamia, bergamot orange
Citrus bigaradia, bigarade orange
Citrus clementina, clementine orange
Citrus indica, Indian wild orange
Citrus leiocarpa, koji orange, smooth-fruited orange
Citrus medioglobosa, naruto orange
Citrus micrantha, small-flowered bitter orange
Citrus myrtifolia, myrtle-leafed orange
Citrus natsudaidai, Japanese summer orange
Citrus nobilis, mandarin orange
Citrus pyriformis, pear-shaped orange
Citrus reticulata, mandarin orange
Citrus suavissima, pleasant orange
Citrus succosa, sappy orange
Citrus suhuiensis, suhui orange
Hortia species
Poncirus trifoliata, Chinese bitter orange

Family Capparaceae
Several species of Capparis, wild orange, native to Australia, including:
Capparis mitchellii

Family Moraceae
Maclura pomifera, Osage orange

Family Loganiaceae
Several species of Strychnos native to Africa, known as wild orange, including:
Strychnos spinosa, monkey orange